The 2011 Orlando City SC season, marked the club's first season in existence, and their first year in the third-tier USL Pro League. Previously, the club was known as the Austin Aztex FC before they were relocated to Orlando, Florida. They won a double, winning the Commissioner's Cup as the top team in the league's regular season, and winning the USL Pro Championship.

Match results

Friendlies 
Orlando City's 2011 pre-season started with three games against Major League Soccer ("MLS") clubs. It won its first match, a 1–0 result against Philadelphia Union at the Citrus Bowl, with then-trainee Lewis Neal scoring the team's first goal. It also played a 4-team classic at the ESPN Wide World of Sports Complex, drawing FC Dallas for its first match on February 24, a 0–1 loss. On February 26 they won again, this time against Toronto FC, a result of 1–0. This marked the club's second victory. Orlando City got the opportunity to play Swedish First Division side BK Häcken in a friendly at the ESPN Wide World of Sports Complex on March 5. City played a hard-fought game, as the game ended in a 2–3 loss.

After playing the MLS teams, Orlando City then played a series of games against Florida college teams. They played Division II runner-up Rollins College Tars on March 16 at the Cahall-Sandspur Field and Barker Family Stadium in Winter Park resulting in a 3–1 victory. They followed this game with a 5–1 victory over Division I University of Central Florida Knights at the UCF Track and Soccer Complex in Orlando. Orlando City played on March 22 against Division I Stetson University Hatters in DeLand, FL, and the final pre-season game was on March 26 against Division I University of South Florida Bulls at the USF Soccer Stadium in Tampa.

Orlando City scheduled mid-season friendlies with two clubs from the Premier League, Bolton Wanderers and Newcastle United.

USL Pro 
Following a season-opening road loss to Richmond Kickers, Orlando City went on an 11-match undefeated run, closing the first half with a record of 8–1–3. Goalkeeper Miguel Gallardo had a league-high eleven clean sheets. The Lions finished with a 15–3–6 record, winning the 2011 Commissioner's Cup and home-field advantage throughout the USL Pro Playoffs.

 The Puerto Rico Soccer League teams (Sevilla FC Puerto Rico, River Plate Puerto Rico and Puerto Rico United) withdrew from USL Pro competition on May 9, 2011. Games played before then counted toward standings, but games scheduled thereafter were rescheduled with other teams. This affected two games for Orlando City: a June 24 away date against River Plate (rescheduled to Antigua), and a June 29 home date against Sevilla (rescheduled to August 3 vs Charleston).

USL Pro Playoffs

2011 U.S. Open Cup 
Orlando City did not give up a goal in its first 217 minutes of U.S. Open Cup competition in 2011, beating ASC New Stars of the USASA Houston Football Association in the first round, and Charleston Battery of USL Pro in the second round. After taking an early lead in its third round match against FC Dallas, a rematch from the WDW Pro Soccer Classic, Dallas scored twice and looked to cruise to the fourth round. Yordany Álvarez stunned Dallas keeper Kevin Hartman with a late equalizer in second half stoppage time, but a barrage of quick attempts on the restart led to a Milton Rodríguez game-winner right before the end of play to eliminate the Lions from the Open Cup.

Club

Roster 
Final roster as of August 4, 2011.

Squad information 

† = "Pro USL" means leagues with professional USL teams, meaning USL First Division and its predecessors (through 2009), USL Second Division (through 2010) and the USSF Division 2 Professional League (2010).

* = Denotes players who were retained after the move of the Austin Aztex FC organization to form Orlando City S.C.

Loans 
Michael Tetteh was loaned to Orlando City on June 29, 2011 on a 10-day contract and returned to Seattle by July 12.

Matt Luzunaris was loaned to Orlando City before July 16, 2011 game against Rochester for an unspecified time period and with San Jose reserving the right to recall. Luzunaris scored goals in his first two games playing for City, against Rochester and English Premier League team Bolton Luzunaris was recalled by San Jose on August 2.

Following the season, Yordany Álvarez was loaned to Real Salt Lake, and Maxwell Griffin was loaned to San Jose Earthquakes. Both loans lasted to the end of the 2011 Major League Soccer season. Since they occurred at the MLS roster deadline, both players were eligible for the MLS playoffs. In addition, Lawrence Olum left on free transfer, as his contract ended, and was signed by Sporting Kansas City.

Players on trial 
List according to roster provided for the 2011 Walt Disney World Pro Soccer Classic.

Personnel 
Coaching staff
{|class="wikitable"
|-
!Position
!Staff
|-
|General Manager||vacant
|-
|Head coach|| Adrian Heath
|-
|Assistant coach|| Ian Fuller
|-
|Goalkeepers Coach|| Marcos Machado
|- Management

Standings

American Division

References

External links 
Orlando City S.C. Official Website

2011
American soccer clubs 2011 season
2011 USL Pro season
2011 in sports in Florida